Candle is a Christian kids' band that is best known for their Agapeland-related children's albums Music Machine and Bullfrogs and Butterflies.  They recorded children's albums for Sparrow Records' Birdwing branch.

The band won the 1988 Dove Award "Children's Music Album of the Year" for their album Bullfrogs and Butterflies III. They have also been nominated for a Grammy Award multiple times.

List of Candle albums
 Agapeland
 Animals and Other Things - nominated for the 1982 Grammy Award "Best Recording for Children"
 Music Machine
 Music Machine II - Dove Winner, nominated for 1983 Grammy Award "Best Recording for Children"
 Music Machine III
 Music Machine Fun Club Album
 Bullfrogs and Butterflies
 Bullfrogs and Butterflies II - nominated for the 1985 Grammy Award "Best Recording for Children"
 Bullfrogs and Butterflies III - winner of the 1988 Dove Award "Children's Music Album of the Year", nominated for the 1987 Grammy Award "Best Recording for Children"
 Bullfrogs and Butterflies IV: I've Been Born Again - nominated for the 1989 Grammy Award "Best Recording for Children"
 Ants'hillvania
 Ants'hillvania II: The Honeydew Adventure
 Once Upon a Christmas: The Original Story
 Sir Oliver's Song
 Nathaniel the Grublet
 The Story of Little Tree
 The Birthday Party
 To The Chief Musician
 To The Chief Musician II
 Agapeland At Play
 The Bible: The Amazing Book
 Lullabies And Nursery Rhymes
 Candle On The Street
Agapeland Character Builder Series

References

American Christian musical groups
American children's musical groups